Snorlax, known in Japan as , is a Pokémon species, a type of Pocket Monster, in Nintendo and Game Freak's Pokémon franchise. Created by Ken Sugimori, Snorlax first appeared in the Game Boy video game Pokémon Red and Blue, and subsequent sequels, later appearing in various merchandise, spin-off titles, and animated and printed adaptations of the franchise. Snorlax is a large, blueish creature with closed slit eyes and a closed mouth that features two upwardly protruding teeth.

Snorlax is voiced by Katsuyuki Konishi in the Japanese versions of the Pokémon anime and the Super Smash Bros. series of video games, and by Hitoshi Takagi and Mitsuru Ogata in the animated shorts Pikachu's Rescue Adventure and Pikachu & Pichu, respectively. In its English-language appearances, it was originally voiced by Michael Haigney, and later Eric Stuart.

Since its debut, Snorlax has received a generally positive reception, and is one of the most popular Pokémon, especially in the Kanto region due to its cuteness.

Conception and characteristics
Snorlax was one of several different designs conceived by Game Freak's character development team and finalized by Ken Sugimori for the first generation of Pocket Monsters games Red and Green, which were localized outside Japan as Pokémon Red and Blue and Yellow. Snorlax is #143 in the Pokédex. It weighs 1,014.1 lbs. (460 kg), and is 6'11" (2.1 m) tall.

In appearance and behavior, Snorlax is inspired by veteran Pokémon game designer Kōji Nishino. Snorlax's Japanese name of "Kabigon" is derived from Kōji Nishino's nickname of "Kirby" (Japanese: カービィ Kābī), which in turn is inspired by the video game character of the same name. According to Game Freak co-founder Junichi Masuda, Nishino was nicknamed "Kirby" because of his large appetite, which directly inspired Snorlax's habit of constantly eating and sleeping.

When translating the Pokémon games for western audiences, Nintendo decided to give the various Pokémon species "clever and descriptive names" related to their appearance or features as a means to make the characters more relatable to American children. Basing the name off its constant sleeping spells, the species was renamed Snorlax, a portmanteau of the words "snore" and "relax".

Snorlax is a noseless ursid-like Pokémon that has a cream-colored face, hands and feet, while the rest of its body is teal in color. Its head is also large, and it has two small canine teeth visibly protruding from its lower jaw. Its feet are large compared to most Pokémon, which assist its balance when it chooses to stand. Although Snorlax's arms are short in relation to its size, they are long enough to enable it to both grab food and eat. Snorlax has been said to weigh over 1,000 pounds, and for a time was considered the heaviest known Pokémon. Due to having an enormous appetite, Snorlax will devour almost anything, even moldy and rotten food. Thanks to its extremely strong digestive juices, Snorlax's stomach can dissolve any kind of poison. As a result, it can eat tainted food without worry.

Despite its size, Snorlax is such a docile Pokémon that children use its large  belly as a place to play. Snorlax has hidden potential to unleash tremendous power when holding the Snorlium Z item, however, which gives access to its signature Z-Move Pulverizing Pancake. Snorlax has a pre-evolution, Munchlax, which is obtainable via breeding a Snorlax that is holding Full Incense. Munchlax also sports a voracious appetite, and evolves into a Snorlax when it has a sufficiently high level of friendship with its Trainer.

Pokémon Sword and Shield saw the introduction of Snorlax's Gigantamax form. When Gigantamaxed, various trees and plants will appear on its belly, having grown from seeds that fell from the plants it had eaten, and it can learn the G-Max Move G-Max Replenish.

Appearances

In video games
Snorlax's most notable role in the Pokémon games has been that of an inadvertent roadblock. In Pokémon Red, Blue, their "upper version" and their remakes, the player must obtain the Poké Flute in order to wake up either of the two Snorlax that block Routes 12 and 16. Snorlax reprises this role in Pokémon Gold, Silver, their "upper version" and remakes. In these games, the player must restore power to Kanto radio tower and then play the radio's Poké Flute channel in front of Snorlax in order to awaken it. Although there is only one Snorlax available to catch, another is used by Red, the protagonist of Red and Blue who acts as these games' final boss.

In Pokémon XD: Gale of Darkness, a pre-evolution of Snorlax named Munchlax was introduced; however, Munchlax remained unobtainable until the release of Pokémon Diamond and Pearl. In Pokémon X and Y, Snorlax is once again a roadblock, this time wandering to a bridge near Camphrier Town and sleeping there. One of Camphrier Town's locals mentions that it does this at least once a year. The Poké Flute must once again be obtained, but this time the player must give it to the owner of Shabboneau Castle so he can wake it up.

In Pokémon Sun, Moon and their "upper versions", Snorlax is among the handful of Pokemon to possess a unique Z-Move. In Snorlax's case, it can use Pulverizing Pancake as long as it is holding Snorlium Z and knows Giga Impact. In Pokémon Sword and Shield, Snorlax received a Gigantamax form with access to the unique G-Max move G-Max Replenish.

In Pokémon Snap, when using the Poké Flute, Snorlax stands up and dances to the music, which is a very high-scoring picture. In Pokémon Ranger, Snorlax is seen sleeping throughout the game, effectively cutting off certain areas until later on. It eventually remains in a cave until the player completes the Ranger Browser. Snorlax is an NPC in PokéPark Wii: Pikachu's Adventure and its sequel, PokéPark 2: Wonders Beyond. Snorlax appears from a Poké Ball in the Super Smash Bros. series, one of the few Pokémon to appear in every installment of the series. Using Body Slam, it jumps up when it appears and slams into whomever it hits. In Melee, Snorlax is seen as a Poké Float that allows players to fight upon on its head and belly. It also appeared in Pokémon Go, Pokémon UNITE and New Pokémon Snap.

In other media
In the Pokémon anime, a number of Snorlax play various supporting roles in certain episodes. The first appearance of a Snorlax was in Episode 41 — Wake Up Snorlax! — in which it becomes a roadblock to the next town Ash is traveling to. Ash Ketchum also captures one in Snack Attack! that was eating the grapefruits of the Grapefruit Islands. He uses it sporadically, mostly opting to use other Pokémon due to it constantly sleeping.  Ash called upon it for the Sumo Conference in Ring Masters, and later used it to defeat Clair's Kingdra in their rematch. He also used Snorlax during the Johto League competition, first against Gary Oak where it quickly defeated Gary's Nidoqueen and Arcanine, but lost to Scizor. Snorlax then fought during Ash's following match against Harrison, defeating his Steelix and Hypno, though in the end it was defeated by his Houndoom. Snorlax later meets and gets to be friends with May's younger Munchlax. Most recently, Snorlax helped Ash earn the Guts Symbol from Greta in Wheel of Frontier by defeating her Hariyama with an Ice Punch and flattening her Medicham with Body Slam. In the Pokémon Adventures manga, Red catches a Snorlax, which he nicknames "Lax". Red caught Lax because he was blocking the road during a bicycle race. He is very gluttonous and is driven into a frenzy by the smell of honey. Later, after extensive training, Lax becomes one of the most physically powerful members of Red's team. 

A Snorlax also appeared in the film Pokémon Detective Pikachu, sleeping on a road in Ryme City.

Reception
Snorlax has received generally positive reception from the media. IGN editor "Pokémon of the Day Chick" called Snorlax the "single most popular non-evolver that isn't also a legendary out there". In 2015, IGN ranked Snorlax as the 28th best Pokémon, with editor Lucas calling it "one of the most recognizable Pokémon". GamesRadar called the character a fan favorite, further describing it as "perhaps the most American of ". Another GamesRadar editor also praised Snorlax, stating it "may be (and is) the greatest Pokemon of all time". Kevin Slackie of Paste listed Snorlax as 30th of the best Pokemon. Michael Derosa of Screen Rant listed Snorlax as one of Ash Ketchum's strongest companions. Andrew Webster of The Verge claimed Snorlax is a best Pokemon of all time. Steven Bogos of The Escapist listed Snorlax as 13th of their favorite Pokemon.

Media and the Make-believe Worlds of Children found that children could relate to Snorlax and interpret aspects of themselves in a positive light, describing it as an icon for a state of regression, but also symbolizing powerful characteristics for children. Snorlax was ranked 8th in Complexs "The 50 Best Pokemon Up to Pokemon Crystal", with Elijah Watson saying Snorlax is "lazy as hell but surprisingly awesome". GameSpy has described it as "downright silly". During the International Pokémon Tournament, Snorlax won by eating a ton to heal itself after being toxicated.

A variety of merchandise depicting Snorlax has been produced such as cushions, beds, bean bag chairs, toys, and lounge chairs.

References

External links

Snorlax on Bulbapedia
Snorlax on Pokemon.com

Pokémon species
Video game characters introduced in 1996
Fictional bears
Video game bosses
Fictional characters who can change size
Video game characters based on real people